Peniel Shin (born March 10, 1993), better known mononymously as Peniel, is an American rapper, singer, songwriter and host based in South Korea. He debuted as a member of the South Korean boy group BtoB in 2012.

Biography
Shin was born in Chicago, Illinois, United States on March 10, 1993. Shin attended Barbara B. Rose Elementary School before going on to Barrington Middle School Prairie Campus, located in the northwest suburbs near Chicago. He attended Chungdam High School after moving to Seoul to train.

Before joining Cube Entertainment, he was a trainee under JYP Entertainment and also appeared in San E's "Tasty San" music video in 2010. In March 2012, he debuted as a lead rapper of idol group BTOB under Cube Entertainment. He became the main host of Arirang's music program, Pops in Seoul in 2013.

In 2016, Shin began to update his fans with his official vlog channel, POV. The channel features activities from Shin's daily life. He released his first English mixtape with KAIROS, titled Homesick on May 1, 2016. On September 19, BtoB Blue released a music video for their debut single "Stand by Me" which was directed by Shin.

In 2017, Shin held his first photography exhibition titled "Penography" which took place at a gallery named White Studio located in Yeongdeungpo-gu, Seoul. The exhibition was held from March 30 to April 12. "Penography" is a compound word of his name, Peniel and photography, and contains Peniel's thoughts of showing a picture containing his own gaze and color. Shin also led the photography for bandmate Changsub's debut Japanese EP bpm 82.5.  After a month, on June 27, he released the digital single "That Girl" as part of BTOB's 2017 solo project, Piece of BtoB.

In 2019, Shin was selected to host an English K-Pop radio show, "Skool Of K-Pop" on tbs eFM starting February 25. He released his second digital single, "B.O.D", on May 13. "B.O.D" is a hip-hop song that delivers the energy and vibe of a party inspired from Korean nightlife. Two months later, Shin released the digital single, "Fly23", on July 31. On August 27, Shin released his fourth digital single, "Flip", featuring South Korean rapper Beenzino. On November 15, he was featured on the song "Beautiful Girl" by Woosung of The Rose.

In 2020, Shin collaborated with bandmate Yook Sung-jae for the song "Hypnotized." The song, which was co-composed by Shin, was released on February 6 as a part of Yook's project single "3X2=6 Part 3". On February 12, he was cast in the DIVE Studios variety program HWAITING!. The program aired on Facebook Watch from February to April. In July, Shin began hosting the DIVE Studios podcast GET REAL alongside BM (of KARD) and Ashley Choi (formerly of Ladies' Code).

On October 27, 2020, Cube announced that they have formed a unit called BtoB 4U consisting Peniel, Eunkwang, Minhyuk and Changsub. The unit debuted on November 16 with their first mini-album, Inside and title track "Show Your Love".

On February 14, 2021, Shin release a new digital single "Valentine".

Personal life
In November 2016, Shin participated as a guest in the South Korean reality show KBS2's Hello Counselor episode 299, opening up about suffering from Alopecia areata. In the broadcast, he took off his hat and unveiled the head with sparse hair, further stating: "I concealed my hair loss for five years, and during those five years I kept wearing a hat for two-to-three years. It was very frustrating because I could not tell the truth. 70% of my hair was missing due to stress-related hair loss. The broadcast was natural and my close friends knew, It was very frustrating, but I finally made it public through Hello, so I feel really comfortable." He said, "At first, my hair-stylist noticed it, but later it got worse. The hospital said it was difficult to treat...I pushed my hair back all and I didn't care, but I'm getting a little bit out of it." As for the reason that he has not disclosed hair loss so far, Peniel said, "I just wanted to go confidently, but I had to hide it for five years after my debut considering the company, members and fans." After the confession, BtoB members leaving affectionate support posts on their Instagram, such as Yook Sung-jae's "Peniel, you got the sweetest heart in the world. We got your back, just stay with us as you are."

Discography

Singles

Mixtapes

Filmography

Television series

Variety shows

Podcasts

As a music video director

Radio show

References

External links
 

1993 births
Living people
Cube Entertainment artists
American male rappers
American male dancers
American expatriates in South Korea
American musicians of Korean descent
Singers from Chicago
South Korean male idols
Video bloggers
BtoB (band) members
21st-century American rappers
21st-century South Korean singers
Male bloggers
21st-century American male singers
21st-century American singers